Rodrigo Gómez (born 25 January 1968) is a Chilean footballer. He played in five matches for the Chile national football team in 1991. He was also part of Chile's squad for the 1991 Copa América tournament.

References

External links
 

1968 births
Living people
Chilean footballers
Chile international footballers
Place of birth missing (living people)
Association football midfielders